The Beqaa Valley (Lebanese ), also transliterated as Bekaa, Biqâ, and Becaa and known in classical antiquity as Coele-Syria, is a fertile valley in eastern Lebanon. It is Lebanon's most important farming region. Industry also flourishes in Beqaa, especially that related to agriculture.  

The valley is situated between Mount Lebanon to the west and the Anti-Lebanon Mountains to the east. It is the northern continuation of the Jordan Rift Valley, and thus part of the Great Rift Valley, which stretches from Syria to the Red Sea. It has a Mediterranean climate of wet, often snowy winters and dry, warm summers.

The region receives limited rainfall, particularly in the north, because Mount Lebanon creates a rain shadow that blocks precipitation coming from the sea. Nevertheless, two rivers originate in the valley: the Orontes (Asi), which flows north into Syria and Turkey, and the Litani, which flows south and then west to the Mediterranean Sea.

From the 1st century BC, when the region was part of the Roman Empire, the Beqaa Valley served as a source of grain for the Roman provinces of the Levant. Today the valley makes up 40 percent of Lebanon's arable land. The northern end of the valley, with its scarce rainfall and less fertile soils, is used primarily as grazing land by pastoral nomads. Farther south, more fertile soils support crops of wheat, maize, cotton, and vegetables, with vineyards and orchards centered on Zahlé. The valley also produces hashish and cultivates opium poppies, which are exported as part of the illegal drug trade. Since 1957 the Litani hydroelectricity project, a series of canals and a dam located at Lake Qaraoun at the southern end of the valley, has improved irrigation to farms in Beqaa Valley.

History
The Beqaa valley was known as Amqu during the Bronze age. While the identity of the inhabitants is not known for certain, the region was part of the Amorite Kingdoms of Amurru and Qatna. To the southwest of Baalbek was Enišasi, a city or city-state mentioned in the 1350-1335 BC Amarna letters correspondence, written by two rulers of the city Šatiya and Abdi-Riša. By the early Iron Age, the Beqaa valley came to be dominated by Phoenician and Aramaic speaking communities. The Aramaeans established the kingdom of Aram-Zobah in the region between the 11th and 10th centuries BC, and the valley was possibly the birthplace of Hazael, who expanded his domain as far as Palestine and present-day southern Turkey, and may have crossed the Euphrates.

By the time of Alexander of Macedon, the Itureans, a possibly Arab or Aramaean people, lived in the valley and Mount Lebanon. In the Histories of Alexander the Great, the Itureans were described as 'Arab peasants' in the mountains who slaughtered about thirty Macedonians, prompting Alexander to go on an expedition against them. Later the Itureans broke away from the weakened Seleucid Empire.
From their base in the Bekaa, the Itureans expanded their territory to include the Phoenician cities of the coast, and came close to Damascus. Their territory was eventually absorbed into the rest of Roman Syria. The valley was of considerable importance to the Roman Empire as one of the important agricultural regions in the eastern provinces, and was known for its many temples. The region also gained the attention of the Palmyrene queen Zenobia, who built the Canalizations of Zenobia linking the valley with Palmyra.

Districts and towns

Zahlé is the largest city and the administrative capital of the Beqaa Governorate. It lies just north of the main Beirut–Damascus highway, which bisects the valley. The majority of Zahlé's residents are Lebanese Christian, the majority being  Melkite Greek Catholic, Maronite Catholic, and Greek Orthodox Christians. The town of Anjar, situated in the eastern part of the valley, has a predominantly Armenian Lebanese population and is also famous for its 8th-century Arab ruins.

The majority of the inhabitants of the northern districts of Beqaa, Baalbek, and Hermel, are Lebanese Shia, with the exception of the town of Deir el Ahmar, whose inhabitants are Christians. The Baalbek and Hermel districts have a Christian and Sunni minority, mainly situated further north along the border with Syria.

The western and southern districts of the valley also have a mixed population of Muslims, Christians, and also Druze. The town of Joub Janine with a population of about 12,000, is situated midway in the valley, and its population is Sunni. Joub Janine is the governmental center of the region known as Western Beqaa, with municipal services like the serail, which is the main government building in the area, emergency medical services (Red Cross), a fire department, and a courthouse. Other towns in the Western Beqaa district are Machghara, Sabghine, Kamed al Lawz, Qab Elias, Sohmor, Yohmor. The towns are all a mix of different Lebanese religious confessions. Rachaiya al Wadi, east of the Western Beqaa district, is home to Lebanon's share of Mount Hermon and borders Syria also. The district's capital, also Rachaiya al Wadi (as not to confuse with Rachaiya al Foukhar in South Lebanon), is famous for its old renovated souk and what is known as the castle of independence in which Lebanon's pre-independence leaders were held by French troops before being released in 1943. The southern section of the district is inhabited with Druze and Christian Lebanese, while the other northern section is mainly inhabited by Sunni Lebanese.

Due to wars and the unstable economic and political conditions Lebanon faced in the past, with difficulties some farmers still face today, many previous inhabitants of the valley left for coastal cities in Lebanon or emigrated from the country altogether, with the majority residing in the Americas or Australia.

Landmarks

The ancient Roman ruins of Baalbek, an ancient city named for the Canaanite god Baal. The Romans renamed Baalbek "Heliopolis" and built an impressive temple complex, including temples to Bacchus, Jupiter, Venus, and the Sun. Today, the ruins are the site of the Baalbeck International Festival, which attracts artists and performance groups from around the world.
 Temples of the Beqaa Valley, a collection of shrines and Roman temples dispersed throughout the valley, including in Qasr el Banat and Hosn Niha 
 Tomb of Khawla, alleged shrine of Khawla the daughter of Husayn son of Ali and grandson of Prophet Muhammad
 The Umayyad ruins of Anjar
 Our Lady of Bekaa, a Marian shrine located in Zahlé, with panoramic views of the valley.
 The Aammiq Wetland habitat for a myriad of migrating and resident birds and butterflies
 The Roman Grotto under Château Ksara winery
 Lebanon's tallest minaret, located in the town of Kherbet Rouha
 The Sanctuary of Our Lady of Bechouat
 Roman nymphaeum of Temnin el-Foka
 Lake Qaraoun, the largest artificial water reservoir in Lebanon
 Phoenician ruins of Kamid al lawz
 Roman ruins of Libbaya
 Roman ruins of Qab Elias
 The Pyramid tower of Hermel at the northern end of the valley, possibly a Seleucid, Assyrian or Syrian construction
 Old railway station of Riyaq originally built in 1898, now defunct since 1975
 Tomb of Noah in Karak Nuh, a shrine famously dedicated to Noah since the middle ages and was visited by al-Harawi in 1183
Including the famous Wadi Arayesh area of Zahle, consisting of open air restaurants, cafes and arcades located on the river side of the Berdaouni river, a stream linking to the greater Litani River.

Wines

The Beqaa Valley is home to Lebanon's famous vineyards and wineries. Wine making is a tradition that goes back 6000 years in Lebanon. With an average altitude of 1000 m above sea level, the valley's climate is very suitable to vineyards. Abundant winter rain and much sunshine in the summer helps the grapes ripen easily. There are more than a dozen wineries in the Beqaa Valley, producing over six million bottles a year.  Beqaa Valley wineries include: 

 Château Ka
 Château Kefraya
 Château Khoury
 Château Ksara 
 Château Marsyas
 Château Musar
 Château Qanafar
 Clos Saint Thomas
 Domaine de Baal
 Domaine des Tourelles
Domaine Wardy
 Kroum Kefraya
 Massaya
 Terre Joie

Illicit drugs

Drugs have a long tradition in the Beqaa Valley, from the days of the Roman Empire to the present, cultivators and tribal drug lords have worked with militias to build up a thriving cannabis trade. During the Lebanese Civil War, cannabis cultivation was a major source of income in the Beqaa valley, where most of the country's hashish and opium was produced.
The trade collapsed during the worldwide crackdown on narcotics led by the United States in the early 1990s.  Under pressure from the U.S.  State Department, the occupying Syrian Army plowed up the Beqaa's cannabis fields and sprayed them with poison. Prior to 1991 it was estimated that income generated from illicit crops grown in the Beqaa was around $500 million. According to the UNDP the annual per capita income at that time in the Baalbek and Hermel district did not exceed $500; the same agency estimated the figure for the rest of Lebanon was $2,074. Since the mid-1990s, the culture and production of drugs in the Beqaa valley has been in steady decline, by 2002 an estimated 2,500 hectares of cannabis were limited to the extreme north of the valley, where government presence remains minimal. Every year since 2001 the Lebanese army plows cannabis fields in an effort to destroy the crops before harvest, it is estimated that that action eliminates no more than 30% of overall crops. Although important during the civil war, opium cultivation has become marginal, dropping from an estimated 30 metric tonnes per year in 1983 to negligible amounts in 2004.

Due to increasing political unrest that weakened the central Lebanese government during 2006 Lebanon War and 2007 (Opposition boycott of the government) and due to the lack of viable alternatives (UN promises of irrigation projects and alternative crop subsidies that never materialised) drug cultivation and production have significantly increased, but remain a fraction of the civil war production and limited north of the town of Baalbek, where the rule of tribal law protecting armed families is still strong.

Gallery

See also 

Sheikh Adi ibn Musafir

References

External links

 Beqaa Photo Gallery Ya Libnan

 
Great Rift Valley
Valleys of Lebanon
Emesene dynasty
Tourism in Lebanon
Tourist attractions in Lebanon